Hermocapelia or Hermokapeleia, also possibly known as Thyessos, was a town of ancient Lydia. It was inhabited from Classical through Byzantine times. It stood on the Hermus River, "to the west of Apollonis in its own little plain almost completely surrounded by mountains."

It was mentioned by Pliny the Elder and Hierocles but is best known for its coins which it minted, and which are in existence today.

The city was the site of an ancient bishopric which remains a vacant titular see to this day. 

Its site is located in Sakarkaya, Akhisar, south of Suleymanköy in Asiatic Turkey.

References

Catholic titular sees in Asia
Dioceses established in the 1st century
Ancient Greek archaeological sites in Turkey
Populated places in ancient Lydia
Former populated places in Turkey
Populated places of the Byzantine Empire
Roman towns and cities in Turkey
History of Manisa Province